The 1967 Ontario general election was held on October 17, 1967, to elect the 117 members of the 28th Legislative Assembly of Ontario (Members of Provincial Parliament, or "MPPs") of the Province of Ontario, Canada.

Results

The Ontario Progressive Conservative Party, led by John Robarts, won an eighth consecutive term in office, and maintained its majority in the legislature despite losing eight seats from its result in the previous election.

The Ontario Liberal Party, led by Robert Nixon, increased its caucus from 24 to 28 members, and continued in the role of official opposition. T. Patrick Reid of Rainy River was elected as a Liberal-Labour MPP. He replaced Robert Gibson, the late MPP for Kenora as the legislature's sole Liberal-Labour MPP.

The social democratic Ontario New Democratic Party, led by Donald C. MacDonald, increased its caucus in the legislature from 7 members to 20.

See also
Politics of Ontario
List of Canadian political parties#Ontario
Premier of Ontario
Leader of the Opposition (Ontario)

References

Further reading
 

1967 elections in Canada
1967
1967 in Ontario
October 1967 events in Canada